Cherry Dell is an extinct town in Marion County, in the U.S. state of Missouri.

A post office called Cherry Dell was established in 1879, and remained in operation until 1906. According to tradition, the community was named for a cherry tree near the original town site.

References

Ghost towns in Missouri
Former populated places in Marion County, Missouri